Gilan mausoleum is a monument located on the slope of a hill in Ordubad district of Nakhchivan Autonomous Republic in the territory of Kharabagilan habitation. The mausoleum was discovered accidentally by the local population in 1979. The top tower of the tomb is destroyed, but the tomb is in satisfactory condition.

Architectural features
The plan of the tomb is octagonal internally, and rectangular externally. Inside of the monument there is a low pavement that does not fit with the environment

of the interior. The tomb of the Gilan mausoleum differs from the octagonal tombs of medieval architecture that are spread in Azerbaijan and neighboring countries. Center of cover of the Gilan mausoleum is supported by mushroom-shaped - expanding upward column in center of the interior. The column is also octagonal in the plan.

General composition of Gilan mausoleum is in a style with the  XII century mausoleums of Central Azerbaijan, especially the Red Dome mausoleum. The Gilan mausoleum was built of layers of broken rock fragments from surrounding rocks. Unlike its interior, exterior of the monument is neatly built. In the interior the ceiling and floors are completely, as well as spaces between stones of the wall and central support are plastered with white solution. Dark gray stone cuttings and roughness creates natural decorative order. Expression of the interior of the tomb is based on the pure volume structure of the shapes.

Outside, on the upper layer of tomb a cubicle body was raised. The top tower was completely built of brick and decorated with geometric ornaments made from bricks. The corner of the body were covered with cylindrical brick columns. The bottom part of one of these columns remains. In decoration of the monument, blue glazed bricks were used as well.

Research 
There is no evidence of the time of the mausoleum construction. However, according to the architectural features mentioned above, it is possible to predict the period of the tomb of Gilan for architectural patterns and geometric patterns.

The architectural style of the Gilan mausoleum is in same line with the architectural style of the churches built in the XII century in Central Azerbaijan. Gilan mausoleum can be dated back to the XII century as a result of absence of inscription.

References

Buildings and structures completed in the 13th century
Islamic architecture
Mausoleums in Azerbaijan
Tourist attractions in Azerbaijan
Tourist attractions in Nakhchivan
Buildings and structures in Azerbaijan